A Thief Has Arrived (Spanish: Ha entrado un ladrón) is a 1950 Spanish film directed by Ricardo Gascón and starring Roberto Font and Margarete Genske. It is based on a novel by Wenceslao Fernández Flórez, which had previously been turned into a 1940 film in Argentina. The film was distributed by the Spanish branch of Warner Brothers.

It is based on the homonymous novel by the Spanish writer Wenceslao Fernández Flórez published in 1920.

Synopsis 
Jacinto is an ordinary and faint-hearted man who is in love with the beautiful Natalia. Due to a misunderstanding, he becomes a brave and daring hero for her. From then on, Jacinto will be forced to be consistent with the false image that has made Natalia change her mind.

Cast
In alphabetical order
 Antonio Bofarull 
 Pablo Bofill
 Arturo Cámara 
 Félix de Pomés
 María Victoria Durá 
 Roberto Font 
 Margarete Genske 
 Juana Soler

References

Bibliography 
 de España, Rafael. Directory of Spanish and Portuguese film-makers and films. Greenwood Press, 1994.

External links 
 

1950 films
1950s Spanish-language films
Films directed by Ricardo Gascón
Remakes of Argentine films
Spanish remakes of foreign films
Spanish black-and-white films
1950s Spanish films